Lijndenia brenanii is a species of plant in the family Melastomataceae. It is endemic to Tanzania.

References

Flora of Tanzania
brenanii
Vulnerable plants
Taxonomy articles created by Polbot